Line 27 may refer to:
Line 27 (Chengdu Metro)
Line 27 (Chongqing Rail Transit)
Line 27 (Shanghai Metro)
Changping line of Beijing Subway, also known as Line 27